The Alberta order of precedence is a nominal and symbolic hierarchy of important positions within the province of Alberta. It has no legal standing but is used to dictate ceremonial protocol at events of a provincial nature.

 The King of Canada: His Majesty King Charles III
 Lieutenant Governor of Alberta: Her Honour the Honourable Salma Lakhani 
 Premier of Alberta: The Honourable Danielle Smith 
 The Chief Justice of The Court of Appeal of Alberta: The Honourable Justice Frans Slatter (Acting Chief Justice)
 Former lieutenant governors of Alberta
 The Honourable Donald Ethell 
The Honourable Lois Mitchell 
 Former premiers of Alberta
 The Honourable Ed Stelmach 
 The Honourable Alison Redford 
 The Honourable Dave Hancock 
 The Honourable Rachel Notley 
 The Honourable Jason Kenney 
 Speaker of the Legislative Assembly of Alberta: Nathan Cooper 
 Ambassadors and high commissioners accredited to Canada
 Members of the Executive Council of Alberta, in relative order of precedence as determined by the premier
 Leader of the Official Opposition: Rachel Notley (Accorded a higher rank as a former premier)
 Current members of the King's Privy Council for Canada resident in Alberta, with precedence given to current members of the federal cabinet
 Members of the Legislative Assembly of Alberta with precedence governed by the date of their first election to the Legislature
 Members of the Senate of Canada, who represent Alberta by date of appointment
 The Honourable Douglas Black 
 The Honourable Scott Tannas
The Honourable Patti LaBoucane-Benson
The Honourable Paula Simons
 Members of the House of Commons of Canada who represent Alberta constituencies by date of election
 See Canadian federal election results in Calgary, Canadian federal election results in Edmonton and environs, and Canadian federal election results in rural Alberta
 Superior court justices
 Chief Justice of the Court of King's Bench of Alberta: The Honourable Justice M.T. Moreau
 Justices of the Court of Appeal of Alberta
 Justices of the Court of King's Bench of Alberta
 Heads of religious denominations
 Heads of consular posts: consuls-general; consuls; vice-consuls; consular agents (Precedence is determined by the date that definitive recognition is given by the Governor General)
 Judges of the Provincial Court of Alberta
 Chief Judge of the Provincial Court of Alberta
 Other judges by seniority of appointment
 Mayors of Alberta municipalities
 Aboriginal Leaders
 Chiefs of the Treaty First Nations in Alberta, in order of seniority of election to office;
 President of Métis Settlements General Council
 President of Métis Nation of Alberta: Audrey Poitras
 Deputy Minister to the Premier and Cabinet Secretary
 Clerk of the Legislative Assembly
 Ombudsman
 Provincial Auditor
 Chief Electoral Officer: Glen Resler
 Ethics Commissioner: Marguerite Trussler  
 Information and Privacy Commissioner: Jill Clayton
 Deputy Ministers
 Senior Alberta government officials with rank of Deputy Minister as determined by the Executive Council
 Chief executive officers of Crown corporations (relative precedence determined by date of appointment)
 Leadership of Alberta universities
 Chancellor of the University of Alberta: Ralph B. Young
 Chancellor of the University of Calgary: Jim Dinning
 Chancellor of the University of Lethbridge: Shirley McClellan
 Chairman of the Board, University of Alberta
 Chairman of the Board, University of Calgary
 Chairman of the Board, University of Lethbridge
 Chairman of the Board, Athabasca University
 Chairman of the Board, Mount Royal University
 Chairman of the Board, MacEwan University
 President of the University of Alberta: David H. Turpin
 President of the University of Calgary: Ed McCauley
 President of the University of Lethbridge: Michael J. Mahon
 President of Athabasca University: Frits Pannekoek
 President of Mount Royal University: David Docherty
 President of Grant MacEwan University: David W. Atkinson
 Police and military
 Commanding Officer, "K" Division, Royal Canadian Mounted Police: Curtis Zablocki
 Commander, 3rd Canadian Division: Brigadier-General W.H. Fletcher
 Commanding Officer, 
 Commanding Officer, 1 Canadian Mechanized Brigade Group
 Commanding Officer, 1 Area Support Group
 Commanding Officer, 41 Canadian Brigade Group
 Commanding Officer, 4 Wing

Sources
Government of Alberta: Order of Precedence

References

Alberta
Government of Alberta